Bristo W. Reese was a state legislator in Alabama. He served in the Alabama House of Representatives succeeding  R. L. Bennett, who died, to represent Hale County, Alabama. He served from 1873 to 1875.

He co-signed with other Republican members of the Alabama House a memorial sent to the U.S. Congress detailing alleged abuses by Democrats and their White League allies.

He is listed among the Reconstruction era African American legislators in Alabama commemorated in a historical marker.

See also
African-American officeholders during and following the Reconstruction era

References

Members of the Alabama House of Representatives
African-American state legislators in Alabama
19th-century American politicians
Year of birth missing
Year of death missing